Tystigbreen is a glacier that is located on the border between Vestland and Innlandet counties in Norway. The Norwegian National Road 15 passes the northwest side of the glacier. The mountains Kvitlenova and Mårådalsfjellet lie on the east side of the glacier. A summer ski center is located at the glacier.

See also
List of glaciers in Norway

References

Glaciers of Vestland
Glaciers of Innlandet
Stryn
Skjåk